Clitheroe is a civil parish in Ribble Valley, Lancashire, England.  It contains 117 listed buildings that are recorded in the National Heritage List for England.  Of these, one is listed at Grade I, the highest of the three grades, one is at Grade II*, the middle grade, and the others are at Grade II, the lowest grade.

Following the Norman Conquest, Clitheroe was of military importance, and the castle was built in the late 11th or early 12th century.  The town gained its first charter in 1177.  During the next centuries it was a market town and administrative centre, and its major industries were agriculture, quarrying and lime burning.  By the 19th century it had become a centre of cotton and calico printing, but that industry declined during the 20th century.

Most of the listed buildings are houses with associated structures and shops.  The remains of the castle are listed at Grade I, and St Mary Magdalene's Church is listed at Grade  II*.  The other listed buildings include another church, schools, public houses, civic buildings, a museum, a library, a bridge, a former pinnacle moved from the Houses of Parliament, the three wells that formerly served the town, a war memorial, and a telephone kiosk.

Key

Buildings

Notes and references

Notes

Citations

Sources

#

Lists of listed buildings in Lancashire
Buildings and structures in Ribble Valley
Clitheroe